The Nicholas Way House (also known as Abishai Way House) at 108 Beaver Road in Edgeworth, Pennsylvania, was built in 1838.  This Greek Revival house was added to the National Register of Historic Places on September 13, 1978, and the List of Pittsburgh History and Landmarks Foundation Historic Landmarks in 2002.

References

Houses on the National Register of Historic Places in Pennsylvania
Houses in Allegheny County, Pennsylvania
Houses completed in 1838
Greek Revival houses in Pennsylvania
Pittsburgh History & Landmarks Foundation Historic Landmarks
National Register of Historic Places in Allegheny County, Pennsylvania